Yitachu is a politician from Pochury tribe of Nagaland, India. He was elected to Nagaland Legislative Assembly 4 times from Meluri Assembly constituency in 2003, 2008, 2013 and 2018 Nagaland Legislative Assembly election. He also served briefly as a minister in Nagaland Legislative Assembly.

References 

1967 births
Naga people
Living people
Nagaland MLAs 2003–2008
Nagaland MLAs 2008–2013
Nagaland MLAs 2013–2018
Nagaland MLAs 2018–2023
People from Phek district